Elachista galadella is a moth of the family Elachistidae. It is found in the United States, where it has been recorded from Washington.

References

galadella
Moths described in 1999
Moths of North America
Organisms named after Tolkien and his works